Erzsébet Vígh (born 27 February 1935) is a Hungarian athlete. She competed in the women's javelin throw at the 1956 Summer Olympics.

References

1935 births
Living people
Athletes (track and field) at the 1956 Summer Olympics
Hungarian female javelin throwers
Olympic athletes of Hungary
Sportspeople from Timișoara